Vufflens Castle is a medieval castle in the Swiss municipality of Vufflens-le-Château in the canton of Vaud.  It is a Swiss heritage site of national significance.

History

The castle was built between 1420 and 1430 by Henri de Colombier, an advisor to Duke Amadeus VIII of Savoy, on the site of a previous medieval castle mentioned as early as 1108. In 1530, it was set on fire by Bernese troops. After the death of Philibert de Colombier in 1544, it passed through various owners, and in 1641 it was acquired by the de Senarclens family.  The castle is privately owned.

Castle site
From the previous castle of the lords of Vufflens, nothing remains.  Of the original castle by Henri Colombier, the donjon, several towers, outbuildings, the surrounding wall and the gate house remain.

See also
 List of castles in Switzerland
 Château
 Vufflens-le-Château

References

External links
 

Buildings and structures completed in 1430
Houses completed in the 15th century
Castles in Vaud
Cultural property of national significance in the canton of Vaud